Phonological opacity is a term used in phonology. It was first defined by Kiparsky as a measure of the context or the consequences of a phonological process that may be determined only by examining the surface structure. Kiparsky defined it in the following way:

A phonological rule P, is opaque only if all of the following surface structures exist:

 instance of A in the  environment;
 instance of B not derived from P that occur in the context .

A common example is the interaction of the flapping of // and the raising of // in Canadian English and other dialects. Before voiceless consonants such as [], the diphthong // is raised to sound more like [], so the word write is pronounced []. In some contexts between vowels, // is replaced by the (voiced) flap [], so (for example) patting is pronounced [], similar to padding. In words like writing, where // is followed by // between vowels, both rules apply and the result is []—with // raised to [] and // flapped to []. This output therefore has [] immediately followed by a voiced consonant, even though the rule that produces [] only applies before voiceless consonants. The interaction is thus opaque: [] is present on the surface in an environment that differs from the environment in which the rule that creates it applies.

Counter-feeding and counter-bleeding opacity
Phonological opacity is often the result of the counterfeeding or counterbleeding order of two or more phonological rules, which is called "counter-feeding opacity" or "counter-bleeding opacity". An example of both can be seen in the future-marking suffix -en in the Yokutsan languages. Its vowel is supposed to be an underlying high vowel, though it surfaces as a mid vowel. Vowel rounding always applies before vowel lowering. Due to this order of phonological rules, the interaction of the suffix vowel with rounding harmony is opaque. There is still vowel harmony between the suffix vowel and a preceding high vowel as these vowels agree in roundedness, while a vowel with the feature [-high] would usually be exempt from rounding harmony. As a result of counter-bleeding opacity, the apparent motivation for the vowel harmony has disappeared here. Moreover, as a result of counter-feeding opacity, it cannot be told from the surface structure of the suffix vowel why it fails to harmonize in rounding with preceding mid vowels.

References

Phonology
Linguistic theories and hypotheses